The 1979–80 Scottish Inter-District Championship was a rugby union competition for Scotland's district teams.

This season saw the 27th Scottish Inter-District Championship.

Edinburgh District won the competition with 3 wins.

1979-80 League Table

Results

Round 1

Glasgow District: 

Edinburgh District: 

South of Scotland: P.W. Dods (Gala), D.J. Ledingham (Gala), J.M. Renwick (Hawick), K.W. Robertson (Melrose), G.R.T. Baird (Kelso), J.Y. Rutherford (Selkirk), R.J. Laidlaw (Jed-Forest) [captain]; J. Aitken (Gala), C.T. Deans (Hawick), N.E.K. Pender (Hawick), A.J. Tomes (Hawick), T.A. Smith (Gala), J.M. Berthinussen (Gala), G. Dickson (Gala), H.M. Barnfather (Langholm)

North and Midlands: K. Spowart (Dunfermline), C.D. Reekie (Howe of Fife), M.P.M. Stewart (Gordonians), S.R. Irvine (Gordonians), A.J. Croll (Gordonians), A.D. McCrae (Gordonians), J. Imrie (Howe of Fife); A.D.G. Mackenzie (Highland), J.A. Hardie (Gordonians), B.T.D. Diack (Kirkcaldy), C.E. Snape (Gordonians), C.M. Smylie (Gordonians), A.L. Dunlop (Highland), A.M. Ingle-Finch (Highland) [captain], I.A.M. Paxton (Glenrothes), G.Y. Mackie (Highland)

Round 2

North and Midlands: K. Spowart (Dunfermline), C.D. Reekie (Howe of Fife), M.P.M. Stewart (Gordonians), I.A. Sutherland (Moray), A.J. Croll (Gordonians), A.D. McCrae (Gordonians), J. Imrie (Howe of Fife); A.D.G. Mackenzie (Highland), J.A. Hardie (Gordonians), G. Brown (Dunfermline), C.E. Snape (Gordonians) [captain], A.L. Dunlop (Highland), G. Robertson (Gordonians), I.A.M. Paxton (Glenrothes), G.Y. Mackie (Highland) Replacement: C. Mackay (Dunfermline) for McCrae (79 minutes)

Glasgow District: C.D.R. Mair (West Of Scotland), S. Munro (Ayr), J.S. Gossman (West Of Scotland), A.G. Dougall (Jordanhill), A.D. Armstrong (Jordanhill), B.M. Gossman (West Of Scotland), A.M. Service (West Of Scotland); J. McLaughlan (Jordanhill) [captain], D.R. Livingston (West Of Scotland), H. Campbell (Jordanhill), D. Gray (West Of Scotland), W. Cuthbertson (Kilmarnock), G. Angus (Kilmarnock), J.R. Beattie (Glasgow Academicals), J.R. Dixon (Jordanhill)

Edinburgh District: A.R. Irvine (Heriots FP) [captain], R.S. Page (Heriots FP), A.E. Kennedy (Watsonians), D.I. Johnston (Watsonians), B.H. Hay (Boroughmuir), K.D.M. Wilson (Boroughmuir), A.J.M. Lawson (Heriots FP); J.N. Burnett (Heriots FP), J.C. Munro (Heriots FP), I.G. Milne (Heriots FP), D.G. Armstrong (Leith Academicals), I.K. Lambie (Watsonians), J.H. Calder (Stewart's Melville), W.S. Watson (Boroughmuir), A.K. Brewster (Stewart's Melville)

South of Scotland: P.W. Dods (Gala), D.J. Ledingham (Gala), J.M. Renwick (Hawick), K.W. Robertson (Melrose), G.R.T. Baird (Kelso), J.Y. Rutherford (Selkirk), R.J. Laidlaw (Jed-Forest) [captain]; J. Aitken (Gala), C.T. Deans (Hawick), N.E.K. Pender (Hawick), A.J. Tomes (Hawick), T.A. Smith (Gala), H.M. Barnfather (Langholm), G. Dickson (Gala), J.M. Berthinussen (Gala)

Round 3

Glasgow District: A. Campbell (Hillhead), S. Munro (Ayr), J.S. Gossman (West Of Scotland), A.G. Dougall (Jordanhill), A.D. Armstrong (Jordanhill), B.M. Gossman (West Of Scotland), A.M. Service (West Of Scotland); J. McLaughlan (Jordanhill) [captain], D.R. Livingston (West Of Scotland), H. Campbell (Jordanhill), D. Gray (West Of Scotland), W. Cuthbertson (Kilmarnock), J.R. Dixon (Jordanhill), J.R. Beattie (Glasgow Academicals), G. Angus (Kilmarnock)

South of Scotland: P.W. Dods (Gala), D.J. Ledingham (Gala), J.M. Renwick (Hawick), K.W. Robertson (Melrose), G.R.T. Baird (Kelso), J.Y. Rutherford (Selkirk), R.J. Laidlaw (Jed-Forest) [captain]; J. Aitken (Gala), C.T. Deans (Hawick), R.F. Cunningham (Gala), K.R. Macaulay (Gala), T.A. Smith (Gala), C.B. Hegarty (Hawick), A.J. Campbell (Hawick), G. Dickson (Gala)

Edinburgh District: A.R. Irvine (Heriots FP) [captain], R.S. Page (Heriots FP), A.E. Kennedy (Watsonians), D.I. Johnston (Watsonians), B.H. Hay (Boroughmuir), K.D.M. Wilson (Boroughmuir), A.J.M. Lawson (Heriots FP); D Brewster (Stewart's Melville), J.C. Munro (Heriots FP), I.G. Milne (Heriots FP), D.G. Armstrong (Leith Academicals), I.K. Lambie (Watsonians), J.H. Calder (Stewart's Melville), W.S. Watson (Boroughmuir), A.K. Brewster (Stewart's Melville)

North and Midlands: K.J.M. Spowart (Dunfermline), C.D. Reekie (Howe of Fife), D Cochrane (Harris Academicals), I.A. Sutherland (Moray), M.P.M. Stewart (Gordonians), R.L. Lamb (Harris Academicals), C. Mackay (Dunfermline); A.D.G. Mackenzie (Highland), J.A. Hardie (Gordonians), G. Brown (Dunfermline), C.E. Snape (Gordonians) [captain], A.L. Dunlop (Highland), G. Robertson (Gordonians), I.A.M. Paxton (Glenrothes), G.Y. Mackie (Highland)  Replacements: K. Gillies (Strathmore) for Mackenzie (44 minutes), J. Imrie (Howe of Fife) for Paxton (51 minutes)

Matches outwith the Championship

Other Scottish matches

Glasgow: 

Rest of the West:

Glasgow: 

Anglo-Scots:

Junior matches

South: 

Glasgow District:

Glasgow District: 

Edinburgh District: 

Edinburgh District: 

South:

Glasgow District: 

Midlands District:

Edinburgh District: 

Midlands District:

Midlands District: 

South of Scotland District:

English matches

South of Scotland District: 

Northumberland: 

Edinburgh District: 

Northumberland: 

Lancashire: 

Glasgow District: 

Durham County: 

South of Scotland District:

Trial matches

Blues: 

Whites:

International matches

South: 

New Zealand:

Edinburgh District: 

New Zealand:

Glasgow District: 

New Zealand:

Anglo-Scots: 

New Zealand:

References

1979–80 in Scottish rugby union
1979-80